Are You Lonely for Me may refer to:

 "Are You Lonely for Me" (Freddie Scott song), 1966
 "Are You Lonely for Me" (The Rude Boys song), 1991